Middle Grove or Middlegrove may refer to the following places in the United States:

 Middlegrove, Illinois
 Middle Grove, Missouri
 Middle Grove, New York
 Middle Grove, Oregon